Joe Diver is a Gaelic footballer who plays for the Derry county team, with whom he has won a National League title. Diver plays his club football for Bellaghy Wolfe Tones, and won the Derry Senior Football Championship with the club.

For both club and county Diver usually plays in midfield. He has also played in the half forward line on occasion.

Playing career

Inter-county
In 2000, when Derry won the Ulster Minor Championship, Diver made a late substitute appearance in the All-Ireland Minor semi-final against Cork. That game was shrouded in controversy, because a Cork player who was sent-off did not leave the field of play. Diver did not play Under 21 football with Derry as he was traveling in the United States.

Diver was first called up to the Derry Senior football panel in November 2005 for the 2006 season by Paddy Crozier. He made his competitive Derry debut on 8 January 2006 against Monaghan in that year's Dr McKenna Cup. His Championship debut came that year in a six-point victory over Tyrone at the age of 24.

He was part of the Derry team that won the 2008 National League where Derry beat Kerry in the final.

Diver played at midfield on the Derry team that reached the 2011 Ulster Senior championship final, and was made Vice Captain of Derry for 2012 season.

Club
In 2005 he won the Derry Championship with Bellaghy and helped the club reach the Ulster Senior Club Football Championship final, in which they were defeated by St. Gall's.

While in America, he helped the Derry club side win the 2003 New York Junior Football Championship.

Honours

Inter-county
 1 National Football League 2008
 1 Dr McKenna Cup 2011
 1 Ulster Minor Football Championship 2000

Club
Ulster Senior Club Football Championship: Runner up: 2005
Derry Senior Football Championship: Winner: 2005. Runner up: 2004, 2007
Derry Senior Football League: Winner: 2004
New York Junior Football Championship: Winner: 2003

References

External links
Player profiles on Official Derry GAA website

Living people
Year of birth missing (living people)
Bellaghy Gaelic footballers
Derry inter-county Gaelic footballers